WD J0651+2844 is a white dwarf binary star system composed of two white dwarfs. They are approximately 120,000 km apart and complete an orbit around their barycenter in less than 13 minutes. This produces an eclipse every 6 minutes. This makes it possible to gather enough data to produce extremely accurate predictions of each future eclipse. The eclipse times deviate from the time predicted in a way consistent with gravitational waves.

References

Gemini (constellation)
Eclipsing binaries
Spectroscopic binaries
White dwarfs
SDSS objects